Rjukandefossen is a double waterfall of approximately 18 metres located in the vicinity of the village Tuv in the municipality of Hemsedal in Viken county, Norway.

The Rjukandefoss receives water from Mørkedøla which is a catchment for much of the melting snow in the Hemsedal fell.

A suspension bridge is located about 50–100 metres after the waterfall, which can be used to cross the river.

The name
See > Rjukan Falls

References

Landforms of Viken (county)
Waterfalls of Norway